Liobagrus andersoni is a species of catfish in the family Amblycipitidae (the torrent catfishes) endemic to South Korea. This species reaches a length of  TL.

References

External links 
 

Liobagrus
Fish of East Asia
Endemic fauna of South Korea
Taxa named by Charles Tate Regan
Fish described in 1908